Alipura was a princely state in what is today the Chhatarpur District in the Indian state of Madhya Pradesh.

History
The state was established in 1757 by Aman Singh, Raja of Panna State by granting the lands surrounding Alipura town to Achal Singh, son of Mukund Singh, who was the sardar of Panna at that time. The principality became a British protectorate in 1808 and was made part of the Bundelkhand Agency of Central India.

The last Pratihara ruler of Alipura signed the instrument of accession to the Indian Union on 1 January 1950.

Rulers
The rulers used the title Rao.

Title Rao
1757–1790 Achal Singh (d. 1790) 
1790–1835 Pratap Singh 
1835–1840 Pancham Singh 
1840–1841 Daulat Singh
1841–1871 Hindupat Singh (d. 1871) 
 3 November 1871 – 1922 Chhatrapati Singh (b. 1853 – d. 1922) 
26 Mar 1922 – Nov 1934 Harpal Singh (b. 1882 – d. 1934) (regent 1919 – 1922)
Nov 1934 – 1934 Bhopal Singh Ju Deo
1934–15 Aug 1947 Raghuraj Singh Ju Deo (b. 1901 – d. 1987)

Alipura palace
Built by the rulers of Alipura State the main part of palace is about 150 years old, with a section that is over 3 centuries old. The building has been renovated and converted to a heritage hotel that is run by a direct descendant of the former ruling family.

See also
Political integration of India

References

Princely states of Bundelkhand
States and territories established in 1757
Alipura